Antoni Wyche (born September 20, 1977) is a former American professional basketball player who last played for Orange County Gladiators and current assistant coach for the Notre Dame Fighting Irish men's basketball team. He was a four-year letterwinner under Notre Dame head coach John MacLeod from 1995-1999 and served as a team captain during his senior year 1998-1999 during which he averaged 11.3 points and 2.5 rebounds while starting all 30 games.

References

External links
FIBA profile

1977 births
Living people
American expatriate basketball people in North Macedonia
Guards (basketball)
Basketball players from New York City
Niigata Albirex BB players
Notre Dame Fighting Irish men's basketball players
American men's basketball players